Australia Will Be There or Auld Lang Syne - Australia Will Be There is an Australian patriotic song written in 1915 as Australian troops were sent abroad to fight the German and Ottoman forces in Europe and the Middle East. The song was composed by Walter William Francis, a Welshman who immigrated to Australia in 1913 due to bad health.

History
The song is one of the more well-known WW1 patriotic songs known in Australia today. It was one of the songs that Australian troops marched to on their way to fight in battle.

Lyrics 
The song's lyrics makes reference to HMAS Sydney's sinking of the SMS Emden the year prior.

 There are lots and lots of arguments 
 Going on today 
 As to whether dear old England 
 Should be brought into the fray 
 But all right-thinking people 
 Know well we had to fight 
 For the Kaiser’s funny business 
 It wants some putting right. 
 Rally 'round the banner of your country 
 Take the field with brothers o'er the foam 
 On land or sea 
 Wherever you be 
 Keep your eye on Germany 
 But England, home and beauty 
 Have no cause to fear 
 Should auld acquaintance be forgot 
 No, no, no, no, no! 
 Australia will be there 
 Australia will be there 
 You have heard about the Emden ship 
 Cruising all around 
 She was sinking British merchant men 
 Where'er they could be found 
 But one fine morning early 
 The Sydney hove in sight 
 She trained her guns upon them 
 And the German said ‘goodnight’ 
 Rally 'round the banner of your country 
 Take the field with brothers o'er the foam 
 On land or sea 
 Wherever you be 
 Keep your eye on Germany 
 But England, home and beauty 
 Have no cause to fear 
 Should auld acquaintance be forgot 
 No, no, no, no, no! 
 Australia will be there 
 Australia will be there

References

Australian patriotic songs